Christopher Lawrence Fisher (born December 30, 1971) is an American director, writer, producer, and former attorney. He worked on the CBS television series Person of Interest as a director and executive producer.

Early life and education
Born in Pasadena, California, Fisher grew up in Newport Beach. He earned a Bachelor of Arts degree in philosophy and Juris Doctor from the University of Southern California.

Career 
Fisher began his career as a corporate lawyer in London before deciding to work in the entertainment industry. In 2001, Fisher established the production company Imperial Fish Company, which worked on his first film Nightstalker and the film Taboo.

Fisher has directed episodes of various TV series including Rampage: The Hillside Strangler Murders. On May 9, 2008, it was announced that he would direct S. Darko, the sequel to 2001's cult hit Donnie Darko which was directed by Richard Kelly. Fisher received the script to S. Darko in full during the time of the 2007–2008 Writers Guild of America strike but was unable to work on it further as he was a WGA member himself. Ultimately, S. Darko proved to be a box office flop and was critically panned, receiving a score of 13% on Rotten Tomatoes based on negative reviews.

He wrote and directed mystery thriller Meeting Evil, which was released in 2012 and starred Luke Wilson and Samuel L. Jackson. It was adapted from Thomas Berger's 1992 novel of the same name. It received generally negative reviews, and it holds a 13% on Rotten Tomatoes.

Filmography
 2002 Nightstalker
 2005 Dirty
 2006 Rampage: The Hillside Strangler Murders
 2007 Chuck
 2007-2008 Cold Case
 2007-2008 Moonlight
 2009 S. Darko
 2011 Street Kings 2: Motor City
 2012 Meeting Evil

References

External links

1971 births
Living people
University of Southern California alumni
American film directors
American television directors
English-language film directors
American male screenwriters
USC Gould School of Law alumni